Amber shift is a phenomenon of incandescent lamps in which the perceived warmth (or colour temperature) of the light sources changes as larger amounts of electric current flow through it.

Basic example
This can best be seen with domestic lighting which is controlled with dimmers. When the dimmer is turned down the light being produced also appears to be more of a warm, amber colour. Whereas when the light level is increased the light becomes more white.

Uses
This characteristic of incandescent lighting can be used for various practical applications where a different colour temperature of light is required.

Art exhibitions
Often an artist will want to show his or her work in high colour temperature light. The reason for this is because a higher colour temperature will give a more accurate representation of colours in paintings, photos, etc.

Some artists may use amber shift properties to accentuate the warmth of a piece.

Social and dining
Often restaurants, bars and other social gathering places will dim lighting to maximise amber shift. The reason for this is that the warmer (amber shifted) light shows skin tones in a more attractive manner. Some interior designers also feel that warmed light gives a more intimate feel.

Counteracting amber shift
In cases where incandescent light is in use, but a high colour temperature is required, a technique called "colour temperature correction" may be used. This involves placing a "CT" light filter in front of a light source. To the naked eye this type of filter appears blue, but when put in front of an amber shifted light source it counteracts the dominant amber colours to produce a more white light through a process known as subtractive mixing.

Color space
Incandescent light bulbs